Estadio Nacional de Costa Rica may refer to:
 Estadio Nacional de Costa Rica (1924)
 Estadio Nacional de Costa Rica (2011)